Daniel Stahle (born 12 November 1974) is a Bolivian alpine skier. He competed in two events at the 1992 Winter Olympics.

References

External links
 

1974 births
Living people
Bolivian male alpine skiers
Olympic alpine skiers of Bolivia
Alpine skiers at the 1992 Winter Olympics
Place of birth missing (living people)